The 1922–23 Indiana Hoosiers men's basketball team represented Indiana University. Their head coach was Leslie Mann, who was in his 1st year. The team played its home games at the Men's Gymnasium in Bloomington, Indiana, and was a member of the Big Ten Conference.

The Hoosiers finished the regular season with an overall record of 8–7 and a conference record of 5–7, finishing 7th in the Big Ten Conference.

Roster

Schedule/Results

|-
!colspan=8| Regular Season
|-

References

Indiana
Indiana Hoosiers men's basketball seasons
1922 in sports in Indiana
1923 in sports in Indiana